Anton Vasilyevich Orlov (born 1 June 1997) is a Russian football player. He plays for FC Chayka Peschanokopskoye.

Club career
He made his debut in the Russian Professional Football League for FC Sibir-2 Novosibirsk on 22 April 2015 in a game against FC Metallurg Novokuznetsk. He made his debut for the senior squad of FC Sibir Novosibirsk on 26 August 2015 in a Russian Cup game against FC Nosta Novotroitsk.

He made his Russian Football National League debut for FC Mordovia Saransk on 22 July 2018 in a game against FC Armavir.

References

External links
 
 
 Profile by Russian Professional Football League

1997 births
Sportspeople from Novosibirsk
Living people
Russian footballers
Association football midfielders
FC Mordovia Saransk players
FC Sibir Novosibirsk players
FC Urozhay Krasnodar players
FC Chayka Peschanokopskoye players
FC Nosta Novotroitsk players